Statistics of Swiss National League A in the 1990–91 football season.

Overview
It was contested by 12 teams, and Grasshopper Club Zürich won the championship.

First stage

Table

Results

Second stage

Championship group

Table

Results

Promotion/relegation group

Group A

Table

Results

Group B

Table

Results

Sources
 Switzerland 1990–91 at RSSSF

Swiss Football League seasons
Swiss
1990–91 in Swiss football